The 2016–17 Liga Premier de Ascenso season was split in two tournaments Apertura and Clausura. Liga Premier was the third-tier football league of Mexico. The season was played between 12 August 2016 and 13 May 2017.

Torneo Apertura

Changes from the previous season 
48 teams participated in this tournament.

Atlético Veracruz moved to Ensenada and became Cuervos de Ensenada.
Dorados Premier leaves the category and entered Necaxa Premier instead.
Mineros de Fresnillo played the league after a season of extension to improve its sports facilities.
C.D. Uruapan could not dispute this competition and lent its franchise to Titanes de Saltillo.
Reboceros de La Piedad, Sporting Canamy and FC Politécnico were accepted in the tournament as expansion teams.
Real Zamora was promoted from the Liga de Nuevos Talentos.
UdeG "B" was promoted from Tercera División.

Stadiums and Locations

Group 1

Group 2

Group 3 
{{Location map+ |Mexico |width=500|float=right |caption=Location of teams in the 2016–17 LPA Group 3 |places=

Regular season

Group 1

Standings

Results

Group 2

Standings

Results

Group 3

Standings

Results

Regular-season statistics

Top goalscorers 
Players sorted first by goals scored, then by last name.

Source: Liga Premier

Liguilla

Liguilla de Ascenso (Promotion Playoffs) 
The four best teams of each group play two games against each other on a home-and-away basis. The higher seeded teams play on their home field during the second leg. The winner of each match up is determined by aggregate score. In the quarterfinals and semifinals, if the two teams are tied on aggregate the higher seeded team advances. In the final, if the two teams are tied after both legs, the match goes to extra time and, if necessary, a penalty shoot-out.

Quarter-finals 
The first legs was played on 26 and 27 November, and the second legs was played on 3 December 2016.

First leg

Second leg

Semi-finals 
The first legs was played on 7 December, and the second legs was played on 10 December 2016.

First leg

Second leg

Final 
The first leg was played on 14 December, and the second leg was played on 17 December 2016.

First leg

Second leg

Liguilla de Filiales (Reserve Teams Playoffs) 
The eight best reserve teams are divided into two groups of four clubs, the members play round-trip matches in round robin format. The leaders of the groups are classified to the final, which is played two round games, to determine the champion of reserve teams.

Group 1

Group 2

Final 
The first leg was played on 15 December, and the second leg was played on 18 December 2016.

Torneo Clausura

Changes from the previous tournament 
47 teams participated in this tournament. Coras "B" was withdrawn before the start of the competition and all his matches were canceled.

Regular season

Group 1

Standings

Results

Group 2

Standings

Results

Group 3

Standings

Results

Regular-season statistics

Top goalscorers 
Players sorted first by goals scored, then by last name.

Source: Liga Premier

Liguilla

Liguilla de Ascenso (Promotion Playoffs) 
The four best teams of each group play two games against each other on a home-and-away basis. The higher seeded teams play on their home field during the second leg. The winner of each match up is determined by aggregate score. In the quarterfinals and semifinals, if the two teams are tied on aggregate the higher seeded team advances. In the final, if the two teams are tied after both legs, the match goes to extra time and, if necessary, a penalty shoot-out.

(*) Murciélagos "B" was disqualified for having debts with the FMF. Irapuato qualified directly to the semi-finals

Quarter-finals 
The first legs was played on 22 and 23 April, and the second legs was played on 29 April 2017.

First leg

Second leg

Semi-finals 
The first legs was played on 3 May, and the second legs was played on 6 May 2017.

First leg

Second leg

Final 
The first leg was played on 10 May, and the second leg was played on 13 May 2017.

First leg

Second leg

Liguilla de Filiales (Reserve Teams Playoffs) 
The eight best reserve teams are divided into two groups of four clubs, the members play round-trip matches in round robin format. The leaders of the groups are classified to the final, which is played two round games, to determine the champion of reserve teams.

Group 1

Group 2

Final 
The first leg was played on 10 May, and the second leg was played on 13 May 2017.

Relegation Table 

Last updated: 20 April 2017 Source: Liga Premier FMFP = Position; G = Games played; Pts = Points; Pts/G = Ratio of points to games played

Promotion to Ascenso MX 
As champion of the two tournaments of the season, Tlaxcala F.C. won the right to be promoted to Ascenso MX, however, because its stadium did not meet the requirements of the league, it was granted a one-year extension to be able to improve its facilities and join the league in 2018.  In May 2018 the team lost its right to play at the Ascenso MX for not complying with the improvements in its stadium that were required to be able to participate in the division.

See also 
2016–17 Liga MX season
2016–17 Ascenso MX season
2016–17 Liga de Nuevos Talentos season

References

External links 
 Official website of Liga Premier
 Magazine page 

 
1